Musse Yohannes (born 9 October 1958) is an Ethiopian former cyclist. He competed in the individual road race event at the 1980 Summer Olympics.

References

External links
 

1958 births
Living people
Ethiopian male cyclists
Olympic cyclists of Ethiopia
Cyclists at the 1980 Summer Olympics
Place of birth missing (living people)